Adam's Law may refer to either:

 Law of total expectation, a result in probability theory, or
 Adam Walsh Child Protection and Safety Act, a statute regarding sex offender registration